Thomas A. Kercheval (January 16, 1837 – March 22, 1915) was a Republican Tennessee Senator and the Mayor of Nashville for twelve years.

Early life
Kercheval was born in Maury County, Tennessee on January 16, 1837. He was educated at Jackson College in Maury County and also attended Burritt College for two years. He studied law with his brother, William F. Kercheval, in Fayetteville, Tennessee, and was admitted to the bar in January, 1860.

Career
In December, 1862, he moved to Nashville and worked in the Provost Marshal's office from 1863 to 1864. Kercheval was first elected to the State Legislature in 1865, during the reorganization of the state government under William Brownlow's administration. He served from 1865 to 1869. Afterward, he practiced law in Nashville until 1871, when he was elected Alderman of the Fourth Ward, and to the City Council of Nashville. He was elected Mayor of Nashville in 1872, and reelected in 1873. He ran for a third term, but was defeated by Morton B. Howell. After Howell's first term as mayor expired, Kercheval was reelected in 1875. He continued to serve successive terms up until his defeat by Claiborne Hooper Phillips in 1883. Kercheval was again reelected in 1886, but resigned as mayor in 1888 to join the Board of Public Works. The remainder of his term was filled by Charles P. McCarver.

Personal life and death
On October 11, 1874, Kercheval married Alice Gardner Brien of Nashville. He died in Nashville on March 22, 1915. He is interred at Mount Olivet Cemetery.

References

Whitson, L. D. Personal Sketches of Members of the Forty-Fourth General Assembly of Tennessee. Nashville, TN: Southern Methodist Publishing House, 1885.
Wooldridge, John. History of Nashville, Tennessee. Nashville, TN: Publishing House of the Methodist Episcopal Church, South, 1890.

Tennessee Vital Statistics, Death Certificate No. 8-523

Tennessee state senators
1837 births
1915 deaths
Mayors of Nashville, Tennessee
19th-century American politicians
People from Maury County, Tennessee
Burritt College alumni
Burials at Mount Olivet Cemetery (Nashville)